"What What (In the Butt)" is a viral video created by Andrew Swant and Bobby Ciraldo for the song of the same name by Samwell. It is known for its numerous blatant and camp references to homosexuality and anal sex. The lyrics of the song, a production of Mike Stasny, mostly revolve around the title. The video was made in Milwaukee, Wisconsin and uploaded on Valentine's Day 2007 to YouTube. As of August 2022, the video has over 73 million views.

Themes and imagery
On 5 March 2007, with regard to the Christian imagery in the video, Samwell said, in an interview with KROQ-FM, that the opening image is "not a cross, but a flaming symbol that [he] just happened to use". According to Stasny, however: "[Samwell] wanted it because he's a Christian but he doesn't do Christian morality. For him, having a burning cross is a way to pay respect to his beliefs."

The video also parodies the flower petal scene from the movie American Beauty (1999).

On April 8, 2007, Brownmark Films released an interview with Samwell, in which he discussed the public reception of the song at length.

Performances and appearances
In April 2008, Samwell appeared on the BBC television show Lily Allen and Friends for an interview and performed a live version of "What What (In the Butt)" with choreographed dancers. The video was also featured in episode #53 of ADD-TV in Manhattan. "What What (In the Butt)" was an official selection at the Milwaukee International Film Festival and the Mix Brasil Film Festival.

In June 2010 Samwell appeared on an episode of Comedy Central's Tosh.0, television show about viral videos. The segment told the story of how the "What What" video was created, followed by an acoustic duet version of the song by Samwell and Josh Homme, lead singer for Queens Of The Stone Age and guitar player for Kyuss.

In 2009, the creators of the video, and Samwell himself, claimed that a feature film called What What (In the Butt): The Movie was in the works.

On November 12, 2010, Brownmark Films filed a copyright infringement lawsuit against MTV Networks, South Park Studios, and Viacom for their use of "What What in the Butt" in a 2008 South Park episode. In July 2011, a federal judge decided that South Park's use of the video fell under the fair use exception to copyright law, and thus the defendants did not owe damages. The decision was unusual in a copyright lawsuit because it was made on a motion to dismiss, before summary judgment. The appeal was dismissed by the Seventh Circuit Court of Appeals on June 7, 2012. Additionally, the district court awarded attorneys' fees to the defendants because the lawsuit was "objectively unreasonable".

In January 2013, a behind-the-scenes video was released which showed footage from the original 2006 green screen shoot.

In popular culture
In the April 2, 2008 episode of South Park, "Canada on Strike", the boys post a viral video on "YouToob" (a fictional version of YouTube) of Butters performing "What What (In the Butt)".
In October 2011 a porn parody of Comedy Central's Tosh.0 was released called Tosh Porn Oh.  The film (porn star Dane Cross' directorial debut) contained a segment based on the "What What (In the Butt)" video with Samwell replaced by the pornographic actress Skin Diamond. The segment features a recreation of the original video which, according to the end credits, was fully licensed by Brownmark Films.
The "What What" song surfaced on an episode of Sweden’s Got Talent in which four naked young men danced to the song.
The creators of the "What What" video projected images of Samwell's iconic pink zeppelin onto buildings in Los Angeles for the five-year anniversary of the project.

See also
LGBT hip hop
"In the Bush"

References

External links

 Official website
 "What What" re-created segment on South Park
 Blogcritics Magazine interview with the creators of the video
 

Viral videos
LGBT-related songs
2007 YouTube videos
2007 songs
Internet memes introduced in 2007